Sir Wilfred Ebenezer Jacobs  (19 October 1919 – 11 March 1995) was the first Governor-General of Antigua and Barbuda.

Biography 
He was trained in the law in London and became an attorney. He was appointed Magistrate for Dominica in 1947 and for St Kitts in 1962. He was then appointed Attorney General of the Leeward Islands for 1957 to 1959 and for Antigua in 1960. From 1960 to 1967 he served in a number of Colonial offices.

He was made Governor of Antigua and Barbuda from 1967 until that country gained independence in 1981, after which he became the first governor-general. He was Governor-General of Antigua and Barbuda from 1 November 1981 to 10 June 1991. He was replaced by Sir James Carlisle.

References

1919 births
1995 deaths
Antigua and Barbuda politicians
Attorneys General of the Leeward Islands
Governors-General of Antigua and Barbuda
Knights Bachelor
Knights Grand Cross of the Order of St Michael and St George
Knights Commander of the Royal Victorian Order
Officers of the Order of the British Empire
Governors of Antigua and Barbuda
Attorneys general of Antigua and Barbuda